Subpterynotus is a genus of sea snails, marine gastropod mollusks in the family Muricidae, the murex snails or rock snails.

Species
Species within the genus Subpterynotus include:

 Subpterynotus exquisitus (Sowerby, 1904)
 Subpterynotus tatei (Verco, 1895)

References

Muricopsinae
Gastropod genera